Gregmark Records was founded by Lester Sill in 1961, a year before he started Philles Records with Phil Spector.

The Paris Sisters recorded five singles for the label, two of them produced by Spector.  "Caravan" is a Gregmark recording attributed to Duane Eddy, but in fact is by the session man, Al Casey.

See also
 List of record labels

Defunct record labels of the United States
Record labels established in 1961